Danny Lopes is an American actor and model.

He played the lead role of "Bobby" in Dante Tomaselli's film Desecration in 1999. Tomaselli cast Danny for his second feature film, Horror in 2002 which also stars Kreskin.

He earned his acting certificate from the New York Film Academy while continuing to work with Tomaselli on his film, Satan's Playground with Ellen Sandweiss, Edwin Neal and Felissa Rose.

Lopes acted in an episode of Agents of S.H.I.E.L.D.

Filmography

 Desecration (1999)
 Horror (2002)
 Satan's Playground (2006)
 Torture Chamber (2012)
 Co-Ed Confidential (2008) (as Guillermo in Season 1 Episode 11 - "I Don't")

References

External links
 Official Website
 

1982 births
Living people
Playgirl Men of the Month
21st-century American businesspeople